Pifer Mountain is a summit in West Virginia, in the United States.

Pifer Mountain has the name of Andrew Pifer.

References

Mountains of Tucker County, West Virginia
Mountains of West Virginia